The Order of St. Andrew the Apostle the First-Called is the highest order conferred by both the Russian Imperial Family (as an Order of Knighthood) and by the Russian Federation (as a state order).
Established as the first and highest order of chivalry of the Russian Tsardom and the Russian Empire in 1698, it was removed from the honours system under the USSR before being re-established as the top Russian civil and military order in 1998.

Russian Empire

Origins
The Order was established in 1698 by Tsar Peter the Great, in honour of Saint Andrew, the first apostle of Jesus and patron saint of Russia. It was bestowed in a single class and was only awarded for the most outstanding civilian or military merit.

Peter learned of the practice of bestowing awards from his travels in the West during the Great Embassy. In the past, service to the Russian state was rewarded with money or large estates. He witnessed first hand the awards ceremonies for England's Order of the Garter and Austria's Order of the Golden Fleece and noticed the loyalty and pride of the awardees. It also saved the state land and money.

Count Fyodor Golovin was the first Knight of the order. Until the Russian Revolution of 1917, just over one thousand awards had been made. During the monarchy, Knights of the Order of St. Andrew also automatically were granted hereditary nobility and received the Order of St. Alexander Nevsky, the Order of the White Eagle, the Order of Saint Anna and the Order St. Stanislaus Knight Grand Cross. Moreover, recipients of lower ranks were automatically promoted to the rank of lieutenant general or vice admiral. The Order of Saint Andrew continues to be awarded by the Russian Imperial House in exile, with most recent investitures having been conferred in 2021. The first post-revolutionary presentation was to Prince Georgy Konstantinovich of Russia on attaining his dynastic majority in April 1923.

Insignia

The insignia of the order consisted of: 

 Badge: an enameled crowned black double-headed eagle bearing a blue St. Andrew's Cross (saltire) with St. Andrew crucified upon it; on the arms of the saltire were the Latin letters 'SAPR' ('St. Andrew, Patron of Russia'). It was worn on a pale blue sash over the right shoulder, or on special occasions on an elaborate 'collar' (chain).
 Star: eight-pointed silver star bearing a miniature of the badge on a golden background at the center, surrounded by the motto "For Faith and Loyalty" (Russian:  Za Veru i Vernost') on a blue ring. It was worn on the left chest.

The insignia of the order could be awarded "with diamonds" as a special distinction. Saint Andrew's Cathedral in Saint Petersburg was the chapter church of this order of chivalry.

Knights

List of notable Knights 

 Sir John Acton, 6th Baronet
 Prince Adalbert of Prussia (1884–1948)
 Adolf Frederick, King of Sweden
 Adolphe, Grand Duke of Luxembourg
 Adolphus Frederick V, Grand Duke of Mecklenburg-Strelitz
 Alois Lexa von Aehrenthal
 Ahmad Shah Qajar
 Albert I of Belgium
 Prince Albert of Prussia (1809–1872)
 Albert I of Saxony
 Archduke Albrecht, Duke of Teschen
 Alexander I of Russia
 Alexander I of Yugoslavia
 Alexander II of Russia
 Alexander III of Russia
 Alexander Kurakin (1697)
 Prince Alexander of Hesse and by Rhine
 Duke Alexander of Oldenburg
 Prince Alexander of Prussia
 Prince Alexander of the Netherlands
 Duke Alexander of Württemberg (1771–1833)
 Grand Duke Alexei Alexandrovich of Russia
 Grand Duke Alexei Mikhailovich of Russia
 Alexei Nikolaevich, Tsarevich of Russia
 Alexei Petrovich, Tsarevich of Russia
 Alfonso XIII of Spain
 Alfred, Duke of Saxe-Coburg and Gotha
 Amadeo I of Spain
 Gyula Andrássy
 Prince Andrew of Greece and Denmark
 Anna Leopoldovna
 Anna I of Russia
 Duke Anthony Ulrich of Brunswick
 Anton Egon, Prince of Fürstenberg-Heiligenberg
 Fyodor Apraksin
 Stepan Fyodorovich Apraksin
 Nikolai Arkharov
 Gustaf Mauritz Armfelt
 Prince Arnulf of Bavaria
 Prince Arthur of Connaught
 Prince August, Duke of Dalarna
 Prince August of Württemberg
 Augustus II the Strong
 Augustus III of Poland
 Prince Augustus of Prussia
 Augustus, Grand Duke of Oldenburg
 Pyotr Bagration
 Michael Andreas Barclay de Tolly
 Aleksandr Baryatinsky
 Maximilian de Beauharnais, 3rd Duke of Leuchtenberg
 Vasili Bebutov
 Alexander von Benckendorff
 Levin August von Bennigsen
 Louis-Alexandre Berthier
 Andrew Bertie
 Alexey Bestuzhev-Ryumin
 Mikhail Petrovich Bestuzhev-Ryumin
 Ivan Betskoy
 Alexander Bezborodko
 Aleksandr Bibikov
 Ernst Johann von Biron
 Peter von Biron
 Otto von Bismarck
 Gebhard Leberecht von Blücher
 Yevgeny Bolkhovitinov
 Boris III of Bulgaria
 Constantin Brâncoveanu
 Franciszek Ksawery Branicki
 George Browne (soldier)
 Jacob Bruce
 Duke Louis Ernest of Brunswick-Lüneburg
 Bernhard von Bülow
 Alexander Buturlin
 Friedrich Wilhelm von Buxhoeveden
 Leo von Caprivi
 Prince Carl, Duke of Västergötland
 Carlos I of Portugal
 Infante Carlos María Isidro of Spain
 Carol I of Romania
 William Cathcart, 1st Earl Cathcart
 Catherine I of Russia
 Catherine the Great
 Charles I of Württemberg
 Charles X
 Charles XIII
 Charles XIV John
 Charles XV
 Charles Augustus, Hereditary Grand Duke of Saxe-Weimar-Eisenach (1844–1894)
 Charles Frederick, Duke of Holstein-Gottorp
 Charles Frederick, Grand Duke of Baden
 Charles Louis, Hereditary Prince of Baden
 Charles Michael, Duke of Mecklenburg
 Prince Charles of Hesse and by Rhine
 Prince Charles of Prussia
 Charles, Grand Duke of Baden
 Alexandra Feodorovna (Charlotte of Prussia)
 Alexey Cherkassky
 Zakhar Chernyshev
 Ivan Chernyshyov
 Piotr Grigoryevich Chernyshev
 Vasily Chichagov
 Joachim Chreptowicz
 Christian VIII of Denmark
 Christian IX of Denmark
 Chulalongkorn
 Andrzej Ciechanowiecki
 Constantine I of Greece
 Constantine II of Greece
 Adam Kazimierz Czartoryski
 Ivan Delyanov
 Grand Duke Dmitry Konstantinovich of Russia
 Vasily Dolgorukov-Krymsky
 Alexey Grigoryevich Dolgorukov
 Vasily Andreyevich Dolgorukov
 Vasily Vladimirovich Dolgorukov
 Mikhail Dragomirov
 Duarte Pio, Duke of Braganza
 John Lambton, 1st Earl of Durham
 Edward VII
 Prince Eitel Friedrich of Prussia
 Elizabeth I of Russia
 Johann Martin von Elmpt
 Ernest I, Duke of Saxe-Coburg and Gotha
 Ernest Augustus, King of Hanover
 Ernest Augustus, Duke of Brunswick
 Prince Ernest Augustus, 3rd Duke of Cumberland and Teviotdale
 Ernest Louis, Grand Duke of Hesse
 Ernst I, Duke of Saxe-Altenburg
 Fredrik von Essen
 Peter Essen
 Archduke Eugen of Austria
 Prince Eugen, Duke of Närke
 Fuad II of Egypt
 Ferdinand I of Austria
 Ferdinand I of Bulgaria
 Ferdinand I of Romania
 Ferdinand I of the Two Sicilies
 Ferdinand II of Portugal
 Ferdinand VII of Spain
 Archduke Ferdinand Karl Joseph of Austria-Este
 Prince Ferdinand of Saxe-Coburg and Gotha
 William Fermor
 Francis IV, Duke of Modena
 Archduke Franz Ferdinand of Austria
 Franz I, Prince of Liechtenstein
 Franz Joseph I of Austria
 Archduke Franz Karl of Austria
 Frederick II Eugene, Duke of Württemberg
 Frederick the Great
 Frederick III, German Emperor
 Frederick IV of Denmark
 Frederick VI of Denmark
 Frederick VII of Denmark
 Frederick VIII of Denmark
 Frederick August I, Duke of Oldenburg
 Frederick Augustus III of Saxony
 Frederick Christian, Elector of Saxony
 Frederick Francis II, Grand Duke of Mecklenburg-Schwerin
 Frederick Francis III, Grand Duke of Mecklenburg-Schwerin
 Frederick I, Grand Duke of Baden
 Prince Frederick of Prussia (1794–1863)
 Frederick I of Württemberg
 Prince Frederick, Duke of York and Albany
 Frederick William II of Prussia
 Frederick William III of Prussia
 Frederick William IV of Prussia
 Frederick William, Elector of Hesse
 Prince Frederick of the Netherlands
 Prince Friedrich Karl of Prussia (1828–1885)
 Archduke Friedrich, Duke of Teschen
 Prince Fushimi Hiroyasu
 Prince Fushimi Sadanaru
 Gavriil Gagarin
 George I of Greece
 George IV
 George V
 Grand Duke George Alexandrovich of Russia
 Prince George of Greece and Denmark
 George, King of Saxony
 Duke George of Oldenburg
 Alexander von Güldenstubbe
 August Neidhardt von Gneisenau
 Alexander Mikhailovich Golitsyn
 Dmitry Mikhailovich Golitsyn the Elder
 Dmitry Mikhailovich Golitsyn the Younger
 Fyodor Alexeyevich Golovin
 Gavriil Golovkin
 Agenor Maria Gołuchowski
 Alexander Gorchakov
 Ivan Goremykin
 Daniil Granin
 Aleksey Greig
 Guangxu Emperor
 Samuel Greig
 Ivan Gudovich
 Iosif Gurko
 Gustaf V
 Gustaf VI Adolf
 Gustav IV Adolf
 Gustav III
 Gustav, Prince of Vasa
 Haakon VII of Norway
 Wilhelm von Hahnke
 Prince Heinrich of Hesse and by Rhine
 Prince Henry of Prussia (1862–1929)
 Heinrich VII, Prince Reuss of Köstritz
 Prince Henry of Prussia (1781–1846)
 Prince Henry of the Netherlands (1820–1879)
 Heraclius II of Georgia
 Prince Hermann of Saxe-Weimar-Eisenach (1825–1901)
 Iosif Igelström
 Ivan VI of Russia
 Archduke John of Austria
 Prince Johann of Schleswig-Holstein-Sonderburg-Glücksburg
 Johann I of Saxony
 John VI of Portugal
 Archduke Joseph of Austria (Palatine of Hungary)
 Joseph, Duke of Saxe-Altenburg
 Mikhail Kakhovsky
 Karl Anton, Prince of Hohenzollern
 Karl August, Grand Duke of Saxe-Weimar-Eisenach
 Karl Leopold, Duke of Mecklenburg-Schwerin
 Karl Philipp, Prince of Schwarzenberg
 Prince Karl Theodor of Bavaria
 James Francis Edward Keith
 Hermann Karl von Keyserling
 Jan Hendrik van Kinsbergen
 Patriarch Kirill of Moscow
 Grand Duke Kirill Vladimirovich of Russia
 Pavel Kiselyov
 Karl Friedrich von dem Knesebeck
 Grand Duke Konstantin Konstantinovich of Russia
 Grand Duke Konstantin Nikolayevich of Russia
 Grand Duke Konstantin Pavlovich of Russia
 Konstantin of Hohenlohe-Schillingsfürst
 Apostol Kostanda
 Wincenty Krasiński
 Prince Kuni Kuniyoshi
 Alexander Kurakin
 Alexey Kurakin
 Boris Kurakin
 Mikhail Kutuzov
 Jacques-Joachim Trotti, marquis de La Chétardie
 Peter Lacy
 Louis Alexandre Andrault de Langeron
 Jean Lannes
 Sergey Stepanovich Lanskoy
 Leonida Bagration of Mukhrani
 Leopold I of Belgium
 Leopold II of Belgium
 Leopold IV, Duke of Anhalt
 George Maximilianovich, 6th Duke of Leuchtenberg
 Sergei Georgievich, 8th Duke of Leuchtenberg
 Nikolai Linevich
 Mikhail Loris-Melikov
 Émile Loubet
 Louis IV, Grand Duke of Hesse
 Louis IX, Landgrave of Hesse-Darmstadt
 Louis XVIII
 Louis Ferdinand, Prince of Prussia
 Louis I, Grand Duke of Baden
 Prince Louis of Battenberg
 Louis Rudolph, Duke of Brunswick-Lüneburg
 Louis Antoine, Duke of Angoulême
 Karl Gustav von Löwenwolde
 Ludwig I of Bavaria
 Ludwig III of Bavaria
 Archduke Ludwig Viktor of Austria
 Luís I of Portugal
 Luitpold, Prince Regent of Bavaria
 Edwin Freiherr von Manteuffel
 Manuel II of Portugal
 Maria Feodorovna (Sophie Dorothea of Württemberg)
 Maria Theresa I, Holy Roman Empress
 Grand Duchess Maria Vladimirovna of Russia
 Maximilian I of Mexico
 Prince Maximilian of Baden
 Michael I of Romania
 Ivan Mazepa
 Duke William of Mecklenburg-Schwerin
 Duke Charles of Mecklenburg
 Emperor Meiji
 Pyotr Melissino
 Alexander Danilovich Menshikov
 Klemens von Metternich
 Peter von Meyendorff
 Grand Duke Michael Nikolaevich of Russia
 Grand Duke Michael Alexandrovich of Russia
 Johann von Michelsohnen
 Miguel I of Portugal
 Mikhail Volkonsky
 Sergey Mikhalkov
 Milan I of Serbia
 Mikhail Miloradovich
 Hugh Henry Mitchell
 Helmuth von Moltke the Elder
 Nikolay Mordvinov (admiral)
 Prince Moritz of Saxe-Altenburg
 Arkady Morkov
 Burkhard Christoph von Münnich
 Joachim Murat
 Mikhail Muravyov-Vilensky
 Valentin Musin-Pushkin
 Ivan Nabokov
 Napoleon I of France
 Napoleon III of France
 Napoléon, Prince Imperial
 Karl Heinrich von Nassau-Siegen
 Ivan Neplyuyev
 Karl Nesselrode
 Leka, Crown Prince of Albania (1982)
 Nicholas I of Russia
 Nicholas II of Russia
 Nicholas Alexandrovich, Tsesarevich of Russia
 Grand Duke Nicholas Nikolaevich of Russia (1831–1891)
 Grand Duke Nicholas Nikolaevich of Russia (1856–1929)
 Nicholas I of Montenegro
 Peter Obolyaninov
 Michał Kazimierz Ogiński
 Grigol Orbeliani
 Alexey Fyodorovich Orlov
 Oscar II
 Fabian Gottlieb von der Osten-Sacken
 Alexander Ivanovich Ostermann-Tolstoy
 Andrey Osterman
 Mikhail Nikolayevich Ostrovsky
 Archduke Otto of Austria (1865–1906)
 Otto I of Bavaria
 Palladius (Rayev)
 Nikita Ivanovich Panin
 Petr Ivanovich Panin
 Ivan Paskevich
 Paul I of Russia
 Grand Duke Paul Alexandrovich of Russia
 Duke Paul Frederick of Mecklenburg
 Pavel Yaguzhinsky
 Pedro V of Portugal
 Pavel Pereleshin
 Peter I, Grand Duke of Oldenburg
 Peter the Great
 Peter I of Serbia
 Peter II of Russia
 Peter III of Russia
 Peter August, Duke of Schleswig-Holstein-Sonderburg-Beck
 Duke Peter of Oldenburg
 Philaret Drozdov
 Prince Philippe, Count of Flanders
 Hans von Plessen
 Konstantin Pobedonostsev
 Stanisław August Poniatowski
 Grigory Potemkin
 Antoni Michał Potocki
 Stanisław Szczęsny Potocki
 Carlo Andrea Pozzo di Borgo
 Prince Frederick William of Hesse-Kassel
 Alexander Prozorovsky
 Yevfimiy Putyatin
 Bahman Mirza Qajar
 Mohammad Ali Shah Qajar
 Mohammad Shah Qajar
 Mohammad Taqi Mirza Rokn ed-Dowleh
 Mozaffar ad-Din Shah Qajar
 Naser al-Din Shah Qajar
 Karol Stanisław Radziwiłł (1734–1790)
 Archduke Rainer Ferdinand of Austria
 Kirill Razumovski
 Alexei Razumovsky
 Michel-Louis-Étienne Regnaud de Saint-Jean d'Angély
 Anikita Repnin
 Nikolai Vasilyeich Repnin
 Armand-Emmanuel de Vignerot du Plessis, duc de Richelieu
 Roman Vorontsov
 Grand Duke George Mikhailovich of Russia
 Christopher Roop
 Fyodor Rostopchin
 Prince Rudolf of Liechtenstein
 Rudolf, Crown Prince of Austria
 Alexander Rumyantsev
 Pyotr Rumyantsev
 François-Emmanuel Guignard, comte de Saint-Priest
 Nikolai Saltykov
 Pyotr Saltykov
 Alexander Samoylov
 Jan Kazimierz Sapieha the Elder
 Grand Duke Sergei Alexandrovich of Russia
 Yakov Shakhovskoy
 Boris Sheremetev
 Pyotr Sheremetev
 Alexander Shuvalov
 Ivan Shuvalov
 Peter Ivanovich Shuvalov
 Jacob von Sievers
 Simeon II of Bulgaria
 Mikhail Speransky
 Afrikan Spir
 Grigory Spiridov
 Gustav Ernst von Stackelberg
 Curt von Stedingk
 Archduke Stephen of Austria (Palatine of Hungary)
 Alexander Suvorov
 Emperor Taishō
 Charles Maurice de Talleyrand-Périgord
 Pyotr Aleksandrovich Tolstoy
 Alexander Tormasov
 Jean Baptiste, marquis de Traversay
 Ivan Trubetskoy
 Nikita Trubetskoy
 Umberto I of Italy
 Vakhtang VI of Kartli
 Prince Valdemar of Denmark
 Adam Veyde
 Victor Amadeus of Anhalt-Bernburg-Schaumburg-Hoym
 Victor Emmanuel III of Italy
 Grand Duke Vladimir Alexandrovich of Russia
 Grand Duke Vladimir Kirillovich of Russia
 Pyotr Mikhailovich Volkonsky
 Illarion Vorontsov-Dashkov
 Mikhail Illarionovich Vorontsov
 Alfred von Waldersee
 Karl Ivanovich Weber
 Arthur Wellesley, 1st Duke of Wellington
 Prince Wilhelm of Prussia (1783–1851)
 Prince Wilhelm, Duke of Södermanland
 Wilhelm I, German Emperor
 Wilhelm II, German Emperor
 Wilhelm, German Crown Prince
 William I of Württemberg
 William II of Württemberg
 William II of the Netherlands
 William III of the Netherlands
 William IV
 William Ernest, Grand Duke of Saxe-Weimar-Eisenach
 Peter Wittgenstein
 Friedrich Graf von Wrangel
 Duke Eugen of Württemberg (1788–1857)
 Duke Eugen of Württemberg (1846–1877)
 Aleksey Petrovich Yermolov
 Józef Zajączek
 August zu Eulenburg
 Nikolay Alexandrovich Zubov
 Platon Zubov
 Valerian Zubov

Russian Federation 

An order with the same name but with different insignia and statutes was first unofficially re-established by the Orthodox Church of Russia on December 27, 1988.  The order was officially re-instated as the highest Russian civilian and military award by Presidential Decree No.757 on June 1, 1998. The Order's award criteria were modified by Presidential Decree 1099 of September 7, 2010.

Statute of the Order 
The Order of St. Andrew the Apostle the First-Called is used to award prominent statesmen and public figures, eminent representatives of science, culture, the arts and various industries for exceptional services, for promoting the prosperity, grandeur and glory of Russia.

The Order may also be awarded to foreign heads of states for outstanding service to the Russian Federation.

Insignia 
The design of the insignia of the modern Order of St. Andrew has changed very little from the imperial design. It consists of:

 a badge (double-headed eagle) attached to a chain (called a "collar") worn around the neck for very special circumstances, or more commonly on a 100 mm-wide blue sash worn over the right shoulder
 a star worn on the left breast

The colour of the sash differs from the colour of the Imperial era, and resembles the shade of the sash of the British Order of the Garter. Members of the military division of the Order have crossed swords added below the crown above the two eagles' heads. On the reverse of the eagle on a white ribbon the motto of the Order appears inscribed in gold letters: «За веру и верность» ("For faith and loyalty").

Recipients

List of notable recipients 

 Heydar Aliyev
 Rasul Gamzatov
 Mikhail Gorbachev
 Daniil Granin
 Mikhail Kalashnikov
 Patriarch Kirill of Moscow
 Sergey Mikhalkov
 Narendra Modi
 Nursultan Nazarbayev
 Valery Shumakov
 Xi Jinping
 Lyudmila Zykina

Gallery 
Select recipients:

See also
Awards and decorations of the Russian Federation

References

External links
 The Commission on State Awards to the President of the Russian Federation
 Order of St Andrew ARCHONS of the Ecumenical Patriarch

 
Orders of chivalry of the Russian Empire
Saint Andrew, Order of
Military awards and decorations of Russia
Civil awards and decorations of Russia
Awards established in 1998
17th-century establishments in Russia
1698 establishments in Russia
1998 establishments in Russia